Tokamak Energy is a fusion power research company based in the United Kingdom, established in 2009.
The company employs over 200 people and holds over 50 families of patent applications. It has built several versions of tokamaks, in the form of spherical tokamaks, with the final aim of reaching commercial fusion power generation.
One of the first was the copper-based ST-25; in 2015 this was upgraded with rare earth–barium–copper oxide (REBCO) high temperature superconductors (HTS) to the ST-25HTS. The most recent tokamak developed is the ST-40, which reached 15 million degrees Celsius in 2018. In March 2022, the same reactor achieved a landmark plasma temperature of 100 million degrees Celsius. 
Tokamak Energy is a spin-off of the Culham Centre for Fusion Energy based in Oxfordshire. As of April 2021, the company has raised over £117m from private investors including L&G Capital,  Dr. Hans-Peter Wild, and David Harding, CEO of Winton Capital. The company aims for energy breakeven in 2025 with the ST-40's successor, the planned ST-F1, and for a commercial grid-connected reactor for 2030 with the ST-E1. Tokamak Energy plans to build compact modular fusion reactors of around 150 MW.

In October 2022, the UKAEA and Tokamak Energy announced a framework agreement for a five-year partnership to collaborate on developing spherical tokamaks, in the UKAEA's case to work towards its STEP machine. The partnership will involve cooperating on diagnostics and remote handling; equipment, facilities, and staff; the fuel cycle; materials development and testing, including HTS; and power generation.

See also 
 China Fusion Engineering Test Reactor
 Commonwealth Fusion Systems
 DEMOnstration Power Station
 Fusion Industry Association
 Spherical Tokamak for Energy Production

References

External links
Tokamak Energy

Fusion power
Electric power companies of the United Kingdom